Juan Ignacio Sánchez Brown (born May 8, 1977), commonly known as Pepe Sánchez, is an Argentine-American former professional basketball player. He played at the point guard position. He was a part of Argentina's 2004 Olympic gold medal team. Pepe Sánchez (1.93 metres, 6 feet 4 inches tall) was the first Argentine to play in the NBA. He played two seasons in the NBA, playing in a total of 38 games with the Philadelphia 76ers (24 games), Atlanta Hawks (5 games), and the Detroit Pistons (9 games), averaging only 5 minutes per game. He also played with the Golden State Warriors, during the NBA preseason. In 2010 he won the Konex Award as one of the five best Basketball Players from the last decade in Argentina.

Professional career

Early years
At age 12, he began playing for the youth team of Club Bahiense del Norte, together with future NBA star Emanuel Ginóbili. At age 17 he moved to Deportivo Roca for the 1994–95 season of the Argentine League, where he played point guard. The following year, he accepted a scholarship offer from Temple University in Philadelphia, but stayed in Argentina during the 1995–96 season, playing for Estudiantes de Bahía Blanca.

After his participation in the 1996 Youth Panamerican Tournament in Puerto Rico, where he represented the junior national team of Argentina, he moved to Philadelphia where he played for the Temple Owls college team for 4 years under Hall of Fame coach John Chaney, and finished his career as the #2 player in the NCAA in steals (he is currently in fifth place in career steals). As a junior, the crafty point guard guided the Owls to an appearance in the Elite Eight, where they fell to Duke. Despite averaging only 5.6 points per game as a senior, he was named a Third Team All-American by the Associated Press. He earned a degree in history at Temple in 2000.

NBA
On October 2, 2000, he was signed as an undrafted free agent by the Philadelphia 76ers, after not being selected in the NBA draft. On October 31, 2000, he became the first Argentine to play in a regular season game in the National Basketball Association, firsting countryman Rubén Wolkowyski by a few minutes. 

On February 22, 2001, he was traded along with Toni Kukoč, Nazr Mohammed and Theo Ratliff to the Atlanta Hawks, in exchange for Roshown McLeod and Dikembe Mutombo. He was waived on March 12, 2001.

On March 15, 2001, he was signed as a free agent by the Philadelphia 76ers. On October 10, 2002, he signed as a free agent with the Detroit Pistons.

On August 21, 2003, he was traded along with Clifford Robinson to the Golden State Warriors, in exchange for Bob Sura. He was waived on October 31, 2003.

Sánchez played a total of 38 games in his NBA career and recorded a total of 20 points, 21 rebounds, 49 assists and 16 steals. His final game was on April 16th, 2003 in a 92 - 99 loss to the Boston Celtics where he played for 6 minutes and the only stat he recorded was 1 rebound.

Europe
In Europe, Sánchez won the EuroLeague championship in the 2001–02 season, while playing with the Greek Basket League club Panathinaikos. He also played in the Spanish League with Etosa Alicante. He transferred to the Spanish League club Unicaja Málaga in 2004, with whom he won the 2005–06 ACB League; Unicaja's first Spanish League title. After three years at Unicaja, he left as a free agent when his contract expired at the end of the 2006–07 season. On August 13, 2007, he signed with FC Barcelona.

In July 2008, he signed with Real Madrid, but he was released in April 2009.

National team career
Sánchez was first called up to the senior men's Argentine national basketball team in 1998. With Argentina, he played at the: FIBA World Cup, at both the 1998 FIBA World Championship and the 2002 FIBA World Championship (where he won the silver medal), the 1999 South American Championship (where he won the silver medal), and at the 2004 Summer Olympic Games (where he won the gold medal).

Sánchez's performance at the 2006 FIBA World Championship was quite satisfactory, with the Argentine press choosing him as the most outstanding player of the team.

Career statistics

Domestic leagues

See also
 List of NCAA Division I men's basketball career steals leaders

References

External links 
 NBA.com Profile
 Euroleague.net Profile
 Short Biography and Statistics 
 Spanish League Profile 
 Latinbasket.com Profile

1977 births
Living people
1998 FIBA World Championship players
2002 FIBA World Championship players
2006 FIBA World Championship players
All-American college men's basketball players
Argentine men's basketball players
Argentine expatriate basketball people in Spain
Argentine expatriate basketball people in the United States
Argentine expatriate sportspeople in Greece
Argentine people of Spanish descent
Atlanta Hawks players
Baloncesto Málaga players
Basketball players at the 2004 Summer Olympics
CB Lucentum Alicante players
Detroit Pistons players
Estudiantes de Bahía Blanca basketball players
FC Barcelona Bàsquet players
Greek Basket League players
Liga ACB players
Medalists at the 2004 Summer Olympics
National Basketball Association players from Argentina
Obras Sanitarias basketball players
Olympic basketball players of Argentina
Olympic gold medalists for Argentina
Olympic medalists in basketball
Panathinaikos B.C. players
Philadelphia 76ers players
Point guards
Real Madrid Baloncesto players
Spanish men's basketball players
Sportspeople from Bahía Blanca
Temple Owls men's basketball players
Undrafted National Basketball Association players